Kuberan is a 2002 Indian Malayalam-language comedy drama film directed by Sundar Das and produced by Menaka under the production company Revathy Kalamandhir. It stars Dileep and Samyuktha Varma in lead roles  along with a supporting cast of Uma Shankari, Harisree Ashokan, Kalabhavan Mani, Indrans, and Jagathy Sreekumar. The film was released during Vishu 2002.

Plot

Siddharthan (Dileep) is an actor who is the guardian of three children from his village. He rents a house posing as a rich man and is visited by his old friend Ramanujan (Kalabhavan Mani), who creates chaos. The young heiress Pooja (Samyuktha Varma), who is the daughter of the owner of a palace, has a haunted past. Her husband was a sadist so she ran away to her native village. Her mother finds out where she is and also comes to the village. Pooja does not want to go with her mother, so she acts like a memory-loss patient and says that their neighbour Siddharthan is her husband and his adopted children are their children. Thus, her mother allows Pooja to stay in the village. Pooja's husband finds her and comes to get her back. Pooja tells Siddharthan that she does not want to go with her husband. Siddharthan fights Pooja's husband, and in the end Gouri's father shoots Pooja's husband and goes to prison. Pooja leaves the house and Siddharthan joins his girlfriend Gauri.

Cast 
Dileep as Siddharthan 
Samyuktha Varma as Pooja 
Kalabhavan Mani as Ramanujan
Uma Shankari as Gauri 
Jagathy Sreekumar as S.I. Thimmayya
Harisree Ashokan as Theyyunni
Indrans as Abdu
Janardhanan as Dr. Vasan
Suresh Krishna as Sanjay, Pooja's Husband
Mohan Sharma as Goppannan, Gouri's Father
Baburaj
Manka Mahesh as Pooja's mother
Bindu Ramakrishnan as Pooja's grandmother
 Vignesh as Siddharth's adopted child
Keerthy Suresh as Siddharth's adopted child
Geetha Salam
Rizabawa as Thampuran, Pooja's Father

Soundtrack 
The film's soundtrack contains six songs, all composed by music director Mohan Sithara, with lyrics written by Gireesh Puthenchery.

Box office
The film was a commercial success.

References

External links
 

2000s Malayalam-language films
2002 comedy-drama films
2002 films
Indian comedy-drama films
Films shot in Ooty
Films scored by Mohan Sithara
Films directed by Sundar Das